The 1932 United States Senate election in Florida was held on November 8, 1932. Incumbent Democratic U.S. Senator Duncan U. Fletcher won re-election to a fifth term.

Fletcher's victory in the June 7 primary was tantamount to election, as the Republican Party did not field a candidate for this election.

Democratic primary

Candidates 
Duncan U. Fletcher, incumbent U.S. Senator

Results

General election

Results

See also 
 1932 United States Senate elections

References

Bibliography

1932
Florida
United States Senate